Francisco Pérez de Prado y Cuesta (1677–1755) was Bishop of Teruel from 1732 to 1755 and Grand Inquisitor of Spain from 1746 to 1755.

Biography

Francisco Pérez de Prado y Cuesta was born in Aranda de Duero on 8 December 1677.  He was appointed Bishop of Teruel on 14 August 1732 and consecrated as a bishop on 7 December 1732.  On 26 July 1746 Ferdinand VI of Spain appointed him Grand Inquisitor of Spain (and thus head of the Spanish Inquisition), and he received his commission on 22 August 1746.  He died on 9 July 1755.

References

1677 births
1755 deaths
18th-century Roman Catholic bishops in Spain
Grand Inquisitors of Spain
People from the Province of Burgos